Charles Anthony Taliaferro (born July 4, 1955 in Richards, Texas) is an American country music singer.

Taliaferro began playing bass guitar in his family's gospel group, but later began playing piano. He moved to Nashville, Tennessee at age 25 and held day jobs, until he was discovered by singer Dottie West. West hired him and had him as her pianist and bandleader, with his first gig occurring at the White House.

Taliaferro continued to tour with his bandmates, The Lloyds, after West died in 1991, and released a self-titled debut album through Curb Records the same year. Six years later, he released a second album, Half Saint, Half Sinner through Rising Tide Records. This album included two singles that made the Hot Country Songs charts: "Bettin' Forever on You" and "He's on the Way Home".

Discography

Studio albums

Singles

Music videos

References

American country singer-songwriters
American male singer-songwriters
Curb Records artists
Rising Tide Records artists
Singer-songwriters from Texas
Living people
1955 births
Country musicians from Texas